Strabomantis sulcatus, also known as Nauta robber frog, is a species of frog in the family Strabomantidae.
It is found in Brazil, Colombia, Ecuador, and Peru.
Its natural habitat is subtropical or tropical moist lowland forest.

References

sulcatus
Amphibians of Brazil
Amphibians of Colombia
Amphibians of Ecuador
Amphibians of Peru
Amphibians described in 1874
Taxonomy articles created by Polbot